Agriloides is a genus of beetles in the family Buprestidae, containing the following species:

 Agriloides aequatoris Obenberger, 1922
 Agriloides bipunctatus Cobos, 1967
 Agriloides difformis Cobos, 1959
 Agriloides erratus (Kerremans, 1900)
 Agriloides foersteri Cobos, 1967
 Agriloides gaucho Obenberger, 1932
 Agriloides gebhardti Obenberger, 1924
 Agriloides gibbifrons (Kerremans, 1899)
 Agriloides hydropicus (Klug, 1825)
 Agriloides jucundus (Kerremans, 1897)
 Agriloides longus Obenberger, 1924
 Agriloides meranus Obenberger, 1942
 Agriloides moorei Curletti, 2015
 Agriloides mrazi Obenberger, 1922
 Agriloides mucoreus Cobos, 1959
 Agriloides nickerli Obenberger, 1924
 Agriloides purpureocaudatus Cobos, 1967
 Agriloides silverioi Cobos, 1956
 Agriloides tuberculatus (Klug, 1825)
 Agriloides velutinus (Kerremans, 1900)

References

Buprestidae genera